

Ahmed Osman (Arabic: أحمد عصمان; born 3 January 1930) is a Moroccan politician who served as the Prime Minister of Morocco between 2 November 1972, and 22 March 1979. He was the eighth prime minister of Morocco and served under king Hassan II.

Early life 
Osman was born on 3 January 1930 in Oujda. He studied at the Collège Royal in Rabat with Hassan II. He studied law in Rabat college, where he obtained his license, and in Bordeaux, where he received the diplomas of higher studies in public law and of private law. He was married to Princess Lalla Nuzha of Morocco from 1964 to 1977, a sister of King Hassan II. He also founded the National Rally of Independents.

Career 
Osman held many positions in the Government. He was Secretary General Ministry of National Defence (1959–1961), Ambassador to Federal Republic of Germany (1961–1962) and the United States (1967–1972), Under Secretary Ministry of Mines and Industry (1962–1964), President of the Moroccan General Navigation Company (1964–1967), Prime Minister (1972–1979), President of the National Rally of Independents (RNI) from 1977, and President of the House of Representatives (1984–1992).

Prime Minister of Morocco 
Osman began his career as prime minister by a visit to France on diplomatic mission. On 3 December 1977, Osman met with President Jimmy Carter of the United States to deliver a personal message from the King, along with ambassador Abdelmajid Benjelloun. On 9 March 1978, Osman visited the Soviet Union, signing a long-term agreement between the USSR and the Government of the Kingdom of Morocco on the Soviet side.

Honours

National honours 
 Knight Grand Cordon of the Order of the Throne.

Foreign honours 
 Knight Grand Cross of the Order of the British Empire (United Kingdom).
 Knight Grand Cross of the Order of Saint Michael and Saint George (United Kingdom).
 Knight Grand Cross of the Order of Merit of the Federal Republic of Germany (Federal Republic of Germany, 1962).

References 

1930 births
Living people
Prime Ministers of Morocco
People from Oujda
National Rally of Independents politicians
Ambassadors of Morocco to France
Ambassadors of Morocco to the United States
Ambassadors of Morocco to Germany
Presidents of the House of Representatives (Morocco)
Alumni of the Collège Royal (Rabat)
Grand Crosses 1st class of the Order of Merit of the Federal Republic of Germany
Knights Grand Cross of the Order of the British Empire
Knights Grand Cross of the Order of St Michael and St George